The 2023 Baylor Bears football team will represent Baylor University in the Big 12 Conference during the 2023 NCAA Division I FBS football season. The Bears are expected to be led by Dave Aranda in his fourth season as their head coach.  

They played their home games at McLane Stadium in Waco, Texas.

Schedule

References

Baylor
Baylor Bears football seasons
Baylor Bears football